Pedmore is a residential suburb of Stourbridge in the West Midlands of England bordering Lye , Wollescote and Oldswinford. It was originally a village in the Worcestershire countryside until extensive housebuilding during the interwar years saw it gradually merged into Stourbridge. The population of the appropriate Dudley Ward (Pedmore and Stourbridge East) taken at the 2011 census was 12,471.

Amenities 

Pedmore is home to the Pedmore Cricket Club and is served by the nearby railway stations of Stourbridge Junction railway station and Hagley railway station.

Pedmore is served by two primary schools - Pedmore Church of England School, and Ham Dingle Primary Academy. It is also served by a secondary school - Pedmore High School, which until July 2004 was called The Grange School.

In the 1920s, Pedmore House was built on what is now the end of Ham Lane. It became a local landmark, offering restaurant facilities that later incorporated the Tuscana Italian restaurant as well as 20-bedroom hotel. It closed in July 2006, despite being hugely popular with customers, and was demolished the following year to make way for a housing development by David Payne homes.

Manchester United and England footballer Ashley Young has lived in Pedmore since 2007. Aston Villa footballer Nigel Reo-Coker is also believed to live in the area. Playwright Stephen Laughton grew up here.

References

External links
British History Online: Pedmore
Pedmore Cricket Club
Pedmore Technology College and Community School
photos of Pedmore and surrounding area on geograph

Areas of the West Midlands (county)
Former civil parishes in the West Midlands (county)
Stourbridge